Campomanesia rufa is a species of plant in the family Myrtaceae. It is endemic to Brazil.

References

rufa
Endemic flora of Brazil
Data deficient plants
Taxonomy articles created by Polbot